Kornerup is a surname. Notable people with the surname include:

Ann-Mari Kornerup, Swedish-Danish textile artist
Ebbe Kornerup (1874–1957), Danish painter and writer
Jacob Kornerup (1825–1913), Danish archaeologist and painter
Ludvig Kornerup (1871–1946), Swedish football referee and manager